Derek Charles Pugh (8 February 1926 – 2 May 2008) was a British track and field athlete who competed in sprinting events.

Athletics career
He represented Great Britain at the 1948 Summer Olympics. He was born in Tooting in London.

Outside Olympic competition, he represented England and won a silver medal in the 4 x 400 relay at the 1950 British Empire Games in Auckland, New Zealand. He was a double champion for Great Britain at the 1950 European Athletics Championships, winning the 400 metres title and the 4×400 metres relay gold medal. He had previously won individual bronze and a relay silver at the 1946 European Athletics Championships. He also won a bronze medal in the relay with England at the 1950 British Empire Games.

Competition record

References

1926 births
2008 deaths
Olympic athletes of Great Britain
Athletes (track and field) at the 1948 Summer Olympics
European Athletics Championships medalists
Athletes from London
People from Tooting
English male sprinters
Commonwealth Games medallists in athletics
Athletes (track and field) at the 1950 British Empire Games
Commonwealth Games silver medallists for England
Medallists at the 1950 British Empire Games